Katherine Monbiot (1964–1997) was an English former World Champion armwrestler, active vegan and dietary nutritionist. In 1993, she was the women World Champion for armwrestling in 55 kg, right hand category.

Biography
Born in 1964, Monbiot was an active vegan, dietary nutritionist and colonic irrigationist. She was the Chairwoman of the International Colonic Association.

In 1993, Monbiot participated in several armwrestling competitions. She achieved third place in the British Arm wrestling Championships held in The Island, Ilford, in Ladies Right 60 kg category. In the 1993 European Arm wrestling competition held in London, England, she received second place in her category.
 In October 1993, Monbiot participated in the World Armwrestling Championship held in Edmonton, Canada, and was declared the world champion in Ladies Right, 55 kg category.

Monbiot died in May 1997, at the age of 33 as a result of injuries she sustained after having slipped in her bathroom.

References

External links
1993 WAF World Championships, XlV WAF World Championships, Edmonton Alberta, Canada
British Armwrestling Championships Top 3 Results, avidhorne-gripmaster.com

1964 births
1997 deaths
British sportswomen
Female arm wrestlers